1. FC Kaan-Marienborn is a German association football club based in Siegen, that competes in Regionalliga West.

History 

The club was founded on 1 July 2007, taking over the football department of TuS 1886 Kaan-Marienborn, which had existed since 1886. Funded by Christoph Thoma, the former managing partner of Maschinenfabrik Herkules in Kaan-Marienborn, the club was promoted to the Landesliga as early as 2008 and was further promoted to the Westfalenliga two years later. There, the team already reached 3rd place in its first season. In 2016, the team was finally promoted to the Oberliga Westfalen as the runner-up of the Westfalenliga Division 2 and winner of the play-off match against the runner-up of the other division, Delbrücker SC. Two years later, they were promoted to the Regionalliga West. After the 2018–19 season, the team was relegated directly after finishing in second to last place.

In the 2019–20 season, the team again competed in the Oberliga Westfalen with Tobias Wurm, who had previously held the position of assistant coach, moving up to head coach and finishing 9th in the table after 21 matchdays. Due to the COVID-19 pandemic in Germany, the season was cut short. The question of promotion was decided on a points per game basis. Here, 1. FC Kaan-Marienborn averaged 1.43 points.

The 2020–21 season also ultimately fell victim to the COVID-19 pandemic. At the end of the season, the team was in 6th place in the table (7 matches, 5 wins, 1 draw, 1 loss).

Since the beginning of October 2021, Thorsten Nehrbauer (the coach with whom the team achieved promotion to the Oberliga and Regionalliga) has been back in Kaan and so the club is looking to achieve promotion to the Regionalliga once again. They achieved this goal at the end of the season, gaining promotion to the 2022–23 Regionalliga West.

Season overview

Managers

Notable players 

Current
 Lars Bender
 Markus Pazurek

Former
 Mehmet Kurt
 René Lewejohann
 Toni Gänge
 Michael Kügler
 Elsamed Ramaj

Honours 

 Oberliga Westfalen
 Champions: 2022

External links 

 Official website
 Der Siegerländer Weg – Sponsors' website with information about the club
 1. FC Kaan-Marienborn at fussball.de

References 

Football clubs in Germany
Football clubs in North Rhine-Westphalia
Association football clubs established in 2007
2007 establishments in Germany